Flight 826 may refer to

United Airlines Flight 826. Mid-air collision on 16 December 1960
Aeroflot Flight 826, crashed on 3 August 1969
United Airlines Flight 826, experienced extreme turbulence on 28 December 1997

0826